Jean-Yves Pollock (born 18 February 1946 in Paris) is a French linguist.

A specialist in comparative syntax, Pollock is best known for his work on verb movement and the structure of IP in French and English.

References 

 (2004), (with C Poletto), "On the Left Periphery of some Romance Wh-questions" in L Rizzi ed. The Structure of CP and IP, Oxford University Press
  (1989), "Verb Movement, Universal Grammar and the Structure of IP", Linguistic Inquiry 20.3 pp 365–424
  (1997), Language et cognition; Introduction au programme minimaliste de la grammaire générative, Presses Universitaires de France, Paris

Linguists from France
Living people
Syntacticians
1946 births